John Pettigrew (31 October 1934 – 19 December 2014) was an Australian soccer player.

Pettigrew made his debut for Australia in October 1955 against South Africa in Newcastle. In 1956 he played in Australia's two matches at the 1956 Olympic Games. His fourth and final match for the national team was a friendly again India in December 1956. Pettigrew died in 2014 aged 80.

References

1934 births
2014 deaths
Australian soccer players
Footballers at the 1956 Summer Olympics
Olympic soccer players of Australia
Association football defenders
Australia international soccer players